Northern Diamonds are a women's cricket team that represent the traditional areas of the North East and Yorkshire, one of eight regional hubs in English domestic women's cricket. They play their home matches at Headingley, the Riverside, Roseworth Terrace and North Marine Road. They are captained by Hollie Armitage and coached by former England cricketer Danielle Hazell.

The team carries over elements of the WCSL team Yorkshire Diamonds, and are partnered with Yorkshire, Durham and Northumberland. The Diamonds reached the final of the first three tournaments that they competed in, but lost each time. They won their first title in 2022, winning the Rachael Heyhoe Flint Trophy.

History
In 2020, women's cricket in England was restructured, creating eight new 'regional hub' teams, with the intention of playing both 50-over and 20-over cricket. Northern Diamonds were one of the sides created under this structure, effectively replacing the Women's Cricket Super League team Yorkshire Diamonds and representing the North East and Yorkshire, partnering with Yorkshire, Durham and Northumberland. The side was to be captained by Hollie Armitage and coached by Danielle Hazell. Due to the COVID-19 pandemic, the 2020 season was truncated, and only 50-over cricket was played, in the Rachael Heyhoe Flint Trophy. Northern Diamonds won the North Group in the competition, winning five of their six matches to progress to the final. In the final, they faced Southern Vipers, who scored 231 batting first. However, Charlotte Taylor's 6/34 helped bowl out the Diamonds for 193, meaning they finished as runners-up. At the end of the season, five Diamonds players were given full-time domestic contracts, the first of their kind in England: Hollie Armitage, Beth Langston, Linsey Smith, Phoebe Graham and Jenny Gunn.

The following season, 2021, Northern Diamonds competed in both the Rachael Heyhoe Flint Trophy and the newly-formed Twenty20 competition, the Charlotte Edwards Cup. In the Charlotte Edwards Cup, the side topped Group B with four wins from their six matches, just edging out Western Storm on Net Run Rate to qualify for the play-off on Finals Day. In the play-off, Diamonds beat Southern Vipers by 18 runs to qualify for the final, where they faced South East Stars. Batting first, Northern Diamonds made 138/4 with captain Armitage making 59*. However, Stars chased the target down with 2 overs to spare to win by 5 wickets. In the Rachael Heyhoe Flint Trophy, Northern Diamonds again qualified for the knockout stages, finishing second in the group with five wins from their seven matches. They faced Central Sparks in the play-off, and beat them by 6 wickets thanks to Ami Campbell's 76 to progress to the final, where they again faced Southern Vipers. Batting first in the final, the Diamonds made 183, with Campbell again top-scoring with 60. However, despite reducing Vipers to 109/7, the side went on to lose the final by 3 wickets with 2 balls to spare.

In 2022, the side finished second in their Charlotte Edwards Cup group, with three wins from their six games, missing out on qualifying for Finals Day as the worst second-placed team. The side topped the group in the Rachael Heyhoe Flint Trophy, however, going unbeaten. They faced Southern Vipers in the final, for the third consecutive time in the Rachael Heyhoe Flint Trophy, but this time emerged victorious by two runs. Diamonds batter Lauren Winfield-Hill was the leading run-scorer in the competition, and bowler Linsey Smith was the joint leading wicket-taker.

Home grounds

Players

Current squad
As per 2022 season.
 No. denotes the player's squad number, as worn on the back of their shirt.
  denotes players with international caps.

Academy
The Northern Diamonds Academy team plays against other regional academies in friendly and festival matches across various formats. The Academy selects players from across the North East region. Players in the 2023 Academy are listed below:

Overseas players
  Leigh Kasperek – New Zealand (2022)

Coaching staff

 Head Coach: Danielle Hazell
 Regional Director: James Carr
 Cricket Operations Manager: Cecilia Allen
 Head Strength & Conditioning Coach: Isaac Leung
 Head Physio: Jo Knowles
 Head Academy Coach: Courtney Winfield-Hill
 Sports Psychologist: Phill Lee
 Sports Nutritionist: Sarah Chantler
 Team Analyst: Harrison Allen
 Performance Coach: Richard Waite

As of the 2022 season.

Seasons

Rachael Heyhoe Flint Trophy

Charlotte Edwards Cup

Statistics

Rachael Heyhoe Flint Trophy

 Abandoned matches are counted as NR (no result)
 Win or loss by super over or boundary count are counted as tied.

Charlotte Edwards Cup

 Abandoned matches are counted as NR (no result)
 Win or loss by super over or boundary count are counted as tied.

Records

Rachael Heyhoe Flint Trophy
Highest team total: 334/6, v Western Storm on 11 September 2022.
Lowest (completed) team total: 151 v Lightning on 31 May 2021.
Highest individual score: 131*, Hollie Armitage v Western Storm on 11 September 2022.
Best individual bowling analysis: 5/20, Katherine Brunt v Central Sparks on 29 August 2020.
Most runs: 716 runs in 23 matches, Hollie Armitage.
Most wickets: 35 wickets in 22 matches, Katie Levick.

Charlotte Edwards Cup
Highest team total: 177/5, v Lightning on 14 May 2022.
Lowest (completed) team total: 92 v North West Thunder on 18 May 2022.
Highest individual score: 96, Lauren Winfield-Hill v Lightning on 14 May 2022.
Best individual bowling analysis: 5/15, Katie Levick v Southern Vipers on 21 May 2022.
Most runs: 292 runs in 14 matches, Hollie Armitage.
Most wickets: 25 wickets in 14 matches, Katie Levick.

Honours
 Rachael Heyhoe Flint Trophy:
 Champions (1) – 2022

See also
 Durham Women cricket team
 Northumberland Women cricket team
 Yorkshire Women cricket team
 Yorkshire Diamonds

References

 
2020 establishments in England
Yorkshire County Cricket Club
Durham County Cricket Club
Cricket in Yorkshire
Cricket in County Durham
Cricket clubs established in 2020
English Domestic Women's Cricket Regional Hub teams